Dawud Ibn Umar Al-Antaki also known as Dawud Al-Antaki was a blind Muslim physician and pharmacist active in Cairo. He was born during the XVI in Al-Foah and died around in Mecca in 1597. He lived most of his life in Antioch before made a pilgrimage to Mecca and took advantage of the trip to visited Damascus  and Cairo. He will then settle in Mecca.

After the hey-day of medicine in the medieval Islamic world, Daud Al-Antaki was one of three great names in the field of Arabic medicine in the fourteenth and fifteenth centuries CE, alongside the Iraqi scholar Yusuf Ibn Ismail Al-Kutbi and the Ottoman physician Khadir Ibn Ali Hajji Basa.

Works

Tadhkr Al Qabb
Tadhkir al-Qabb is a three-part medical book dealing with herbal medicines and includes descriptions of over 3,000 medicinal and aromatic plants.

Others 
Daud al-Antaki also wrote The Book of Precious Kohl for the Evacuation of the President's Eyes  an explanation of Ibn Sina's poem. He also wrote three books on astronomy, some books on logic and a book on psychiatry that contains hadiths in medical advice.

References

 Part or all of the Arabic Wikipedia article (https://ar.wikipedia.org/wiki/%D8%AF%D8%A7%D9%88%D8%AF_%D8%A7%D9%84%D8%A3%D9%86%D8%B7%D8%A7%D9%83%D9%8A and https://ar.wikipedia.org/wiki/%D8%AA%D8%B0%D9%83%D8%B1%D8%A9_%D8%A3%D9%88%D9%84%D9%8A_%D8%A7%D9%84%D8%A3%D9%84%D8%A8%D8%A7%D8%A8_%D9%88%D8%A7%D9%84%D8%AC%D8%A7%D9%85%D8%B9_%D9%84%D9%84%D8%B9%D8%AC%D8%A8_%D8%A7%D9%84%D8%B9%D8%AC%D8%A7%D8%A8)

1599 deaths
Syrian writers
Year of birth unknown
16th-century writers
16th-century physicians from the Ottoman Empire